is a Japanese television series starring Masatoshi Nagase as the private detective Mike Hama. Each episode of the series was a self-contained story, involving different sets of directors and screenwriters, including Isao Yukisada, Gakuryū Ishii, and Alex Cox. Nagase originally starred as Mike Hama in a trilogy of films directed by Kaizo Hayashi, beginning with The Most Terrible Time in My Life.

Synopsis

Mike Hama runs a detective agency from an office on the roof of Nichigeki movie theater. Perpetually short on cash, he takes on all sorts of jobs — missing family members, unfaithful spouses, lost pets — and always gets into trouble.

Production

The Private Detective Mike was Nagase's first television role in a decade. The year before, Nagase had starred in a series of popular commercials for Boss Coffee, directed by Ryosuke Maeda, who would go on to direct the second episode of The Private Detective Mike. Suguru Takeuchi, director of episode ten, was also a commercial and music video director. The remaining directors had experience in feature films as directors, screenwriters or assistant directors. Kaizo Hayashi was not involved in the production of the series because he was overseas at the time.

The series was shot on 16mm film. According to Nagase, the decision was due in part to the fact the character of Mike Hama had originated on film. In addition, the television dramas that Nagase and much of the cast and crew had watched as children, such as Detective Story, had been shot on film, which was then being displaced by video.

The sixth episode, directed by Shinji Aoyama, was the first to be completed. A feature-length version of the episode was screened at the 52nd Berlin International Film Festival under the title Mike Yokohama: A Forest with No Name before the series proper aired on television.

Cast

Guest cast

Episodes

The series aired on Nippon TV every Monday from July 1 to September 16, 2002. The televised version of the series was released on VHS, while the DVD release contained the feature-length director's cuts of each episode. The series' opening sequence directed by fashion photographer Glen Luchford with theme song by Ego-Wrappin' was excluded from feature-length version of the episodes.

On its 20th anniversary, the series was released in its original televised form on Hulu and Amazon Prime in Japan.

Notes

References

External links
 
Official website (in Japanese)
Fan website (in Japanese)
Mike Hama Must Die! Q&A with episode director Alex Cox

2002 Japanese television series debuts
2002 Japanese television series endings
Japanese detective television drama series
Nippon TV dramas